Pleurosticta is a genus of lichen belonging to the family  Parmeliaceae. It has two species. The genus was circumscribed by mycologist Franz Petrak in 1931, with Pleurosticta lichenicola assigned as the type species. This is now known as a synonym of P. acetabulum.

Species
Pleurosticta acetabulum 
Pleurosticta koflerae

References

Parmeliaceae
Lichen genera
Lecanorales genera
Taxa described in 1931
Taxa named by Franz Petrak